William Francis Johnston,  (born 29 June 1930) is an Anglican priest and military chaplain. Between 1980 and 1986, he served as Chaplain-General to the Forces and head of the Royal Army Chaplains' Department, British Army.

Early life and education
Johnston was born on 29 June 1930. He was educated at Wesley College, a Methodist private school in Dublin, Ireland. He studied at Trinity College, Dublin, and graduated with a Bachelor of Arts (BA) degree in 1955; as per tradition, his BA was promoted to a Master of Arts (MA Dubl) in 1969.

Ordained ministry
Johnston was ordained in the Church of Ireland as a deacon in 1955 and as a priest in 1956. From 1955 to 1959, he served his curacy at St John's Church, Orangefield, County Down in the Diocese of Down and Dromore.

On 15 April 1959, Johnston was commissioned into the Royal Army Chaplains' Department (RAChD) as a Chaplain to the Forces 4th Class (equivalent in rank to captain). He was posted to British Army of the Rhine and served as chaplain of the Garrison Church in Hamelin in Germany from 1962 to 1964. From 1977 to 1980, he was Assistant Chaplain General of the South East District. From 1980 to 1986, he served as Chaplain-General to the Forces and was therefore head of the RAChD. As the most senior Anglican chaplain in the British Army, he also served as Archdeacon for the Army and therefore was granted the title The Venerable. During his military career, he saw service in the United Kingdom, Germany, Aden, and Cyprus. He left the British Army in 1987.

Rather than return to the Church of Ireland, Johnston remained in England and became a priest in the Church of England. From 1987 to 1991, he was Priest-in-Charge of St Laurence's Church, Winslow in the Diocese of Oxford. After his parish was merged with another, he served as Rector of the newly created benefice of Winslow with Great Horwood and Addington. He was also Rural Dean of Claydon between 1989 and 1994.

Johnston retired from full-time ministry in 1995. Since then, he has lived in Devon and holds Permission to Officiate in the Diocese of Exeter.

Personal life
In 1963, Johnston married Jennifer Morton. Together, they have two sons and one daughter.

Honours
On 15 April 1980, Johnston  was appointed an Honorary Chaplain to the Queen (QHC). In the 1983 New Year Honours, he was appointed a Companion of the Order of the Bath (CB).

References

 

Royal Army Chaplains' Department officers
Chaplains General to the Forces
Companions of the Order of the Bath
Honorary Chaplains to the Queen
20th-century Irish Anglican priests
Church of England priests
1930 births
Living people
People educated at Wesley College, Dublin
Alumni of Trinity College Dublin